Isla St Clair (born 2 May 1952 as Isabella Margaret Dyce) is a Scottish singer.

Life 
Isla St Clair was born in Grangemouth, central Scotland, in 1952; her mother was Zetta Sinclair. Her family came from northeast Scotland and it was here that she spent her early years. It was in Findochty that she gave her first stage performances, aged three years, at her mother's Brownie concerts and with the local Salvation Army.

In 1955 the family moved to Bradfield Green, near Crewe in Cheshire, before moving back to Scotland in 1960. Zetta Sinclair, Isla's mother, was a talented songwriter and poet, and became a founding member of the Aberdeen Folk Club. The young Isla accompanied her mother to the club where they would both sing. At the club she came to the attention of a BBC producer. She was twelve years old when she sang on her first television programme Talk of the North, followed by the radio series Stories are for Singing. She was a regular guest on many other television and radio shows including Hoot'nanny, My Kind of Folk, Corriefolk, On Tour and Heather Mixture.

Isla was a pupil at Aberdeen Academy and from 1967 Buckie High School. It was on Zetta's remarriage, in 1968, that Isla adopted the original form of her mother's maiden name, St Clair.

In 1969, St Clair moved to Edinburgh to pursue her singing career. During her teenage years she was influenced by her mother's friend Jeannie Robertson, the traditional ballad singer. Another influence was family friend Hamish Henderson of the University of Edinburgh's School of Scottish Studies. He first recorded St Clair when she was twelve. In 1971, St Clair released her first LP Isla St Clair sings Traditional Scottish Songs and she was voted "Female Folk Singer of the Year" by the New Musical Express.

St Clair was offered programmes as diverse as To Scotland With Love for light  entertainment and Let's See for BBC educational television. There followed numerous appearances, both as singer and presenter, on series such as Isla's Island (34 programmes),  Welcome to the Ceilidh (2 series),  The Great Western Musical Thunderbox  and Thingummyjig. St Clair also managed to fit in concert tours of the British Isles, Europe, the United States, and the Soviet Union (2 tours).

In the late 1970s, St Clair went to STV and asked for a job as a continuity announcer, they gave her a co-presenting job on a series called Birthday Honours instead.

St Clair's rise to national prominence was in 1978 when she became co-host with Larry Grayson in BBC Television's The Generation Game. She won a number of awards including the Pye Colour Television Award for "TV Personality of the Year". During her four years on the Generation Game St Clair made television appearances on Morecambe and Wise, Max Bygraves Show, The Royal Variety Show, Parkinson, Blue Peter, Blankety Blank as well as her own series The Farm On The Hill.

In 1981, the BBC offered St Clair the chance to do a series of her own. She decided to make The Song and The Story which involved dressing up in historical costume and explaining the social history behind the folk songs. The series was a success and won The Roses Award "Best Television Programme" and in Munich, the coveted "Prix Jeunesse for Best Light Entertainment".

In 1981, she was also invited to co-present The Travel Show with Des Lynam for BBC2 and the following year she was chosen to co-host Central Television's The Saturday Show with Tommy Boyd.  Despite her success as a presenter St Clair wanted more singing roles, and in 1984 she was offered the part of Maria in The Sound of Music at Worthing, with Edmund Hockridge. Rather than tour with the musical she decided to retire from the business for a while to bring up her young family.

Recordings

During the 1990s St Clair returned to television with guest appearances on BBC Television's Songs of Praise and ITV's Highway. She began by recording Inheritance in 1993, an album of Scottish folk songs. This was followed a year later with a BBC Radio series about folk music called Kindlin' the Fire. In 1995, she devised a series called Tatties and Herrin, commissioned by BBC Radio, which told the story of the fishing and farming communities of Scotland's north east. The songs from the series were released on two albums: The Land and The Sea.  In 1996, St Clair recorded Scenes of Scotland, a collection of her mother's songs. The album was a personal tribute to her mother who had recently died.

In 1998, St Clair appeared in and co-produced When the Pipers Play a documentary film about the great Highland bagpipe. The film was first aired on PBS television in the United States and went on to win four film festival awards. The accompanying CD was also released the same year. Two years later they co-produced, and she presented, the documentary Millennium Pipes about Marie Curie Cancer Care. The same year she was asked to sing her mother's song Dunkirk – Lest We Forget' at the Festival of Remembrance, in the Royal Albert Hall. The song was released on the album Amazing Grace – anthems to inspire.

In 2002, St Clair was awarded an honorary degree as Master of the University of Aberdeen for her lifelong contribution to the traditional music of Scotland.  During the year she released two more albums: the critically acclaimed The Lady and The Piper with Gordon Walker; and My Generation a collection of children's songs.  Other albums followed including Looking Forward To The Past, a collection of timeless love songs; Across the Waters, recorded in Los Angeles with musical support from Eric Rigler; and Great Songs and Ballads of Scotland.

St Clair was invited to sing the lament "Flowers of the Forest" at Tyne Cot Cemetery in Belgium, in 2007, to commemorate the 90th anniversary of the Battle of Passchendaele, in the First World War. The same year she released Highland Laddie a CD and DVD tribute to Scotland's soldiers. The DVD featured her award-winning music video The Scottish Soldier filmed at Edinburgh Castle. This was followed by Remember, another tribute album to all servicemen and women. In 2011, St Clair was asked to record Flowers of Forest again, this time for the Scots Guards album From Helmand to Horse Guards.

Isla St Clair continues to work on radio and stage. She also tours with her three diverse stage shows An Evening With Isla, The Songs and Music of Scotland and Eyes Front with Isla St Clair an audio visual production about songs and film in wartime.

Publications
1981: St Clair, Isla & Turnbull, David The Song and the Story. London: Pelham Books  (to accompany the TV series)

Discography
 Dowie Houms of Yarrow (1965) Scottish School of Studies recording at Pollock Halls, Edinburgh
 Isla St Clair Sings Traditional Scottish Songs Tangent TGS 112 (1972)
 Isla (Christmas Carols) Columbia SKL 5317 (1979)
 70 Golden Nursery Rhymes (1979) (various artists: Isla St Clair, Martin Carthy, Shirley Collins and Percy Edwards)
 The Song and The Story Clare ISLA 1 (1981)
 Shape Up and Dance (1982)
 Inheritance (1993)
 Scenes Of Scotland (1996)
 Tatties and Herrin' – The Land (1997)
 Tatties and Herrin' – The Sea (1997)
 When The Pipers Play (1998)
 When the Pipers Play DVD (1999)
 Murder and Mayhem (2000)
 Royal Lovers and Scandals (2000)
 Pipers on Parade DVD (2000) (also marketed as Millennium Pipes)
 Amazing Grace – anthems to inspire (2002) (re-mastered 2004)
 My Generation (2002)
 The Lady and The Piper (2002)
 Looking Forward to the Past (2003)
 Scottish Connections DVD (2003)
 Highland Laddie (2007)
 Highland Laddie  DVD (2007)
 Across The Waters  (2007)
 Great Songs and Ballads of Scotland  (2008)
 Another Version  (2009)
 Remember  (2009)

TV, film, radio and stage appearances
A selection of her numerous appearances:

 Jim McLeod Show (Grampian TV) 1973, Singer
 Regular Features (BBC TV Scotland) 1973, Singer/Presenter
 Isla's Island – series (Grampian TV) 1973/74,	Singer/Presenter
 Welcome to the Ceilidh – series (Grampian TV) 1974/75, Singer/Presenter
 Let's See – series (BBC Scotland Educational), Singing/Presenting
 The Great Western Musical Thunderbox (HTV) 1975, Singer
 Scotland on Parade – 3 month Tour of USA 1975, Singing
 The Irish Rovers Show (CBS/Granada) 1975, Singer
 Thingummy Jig (Scottish TV) 1975, Singer
 Two Tours of USSR 1976/77, Singing
 Birthday Honours (Scottish TV) 1978, Presenter
 The Generation Game (BBC TV) 1978–82, Co-Host/Singer
 Speak For Yourself (BBC1 Educational), Acting/Presenting
 Children's Video (Longmans) 1979, Singer
 Farm on the Hill (BBC1 children) 1978/80, Presenter
 Max Bygraves Show (Thames) 1979, Acting/Singing
 Morecambe & Wise Show (Thames)1980, Acting/Singing
 Royal Variety Show 
 The Song and The Story – own series (BBC1) (2 awards) 1981, Acting/Singing (see also album & book to accompany the series)
 The Saturday Show (Central TV) 1982/84, Presenting/Singing
 Sound Of Music – Stage Musical, 1984, Leading Lady
 Highway (BBC1) various dates, Singer
 Songs of Praise (BBC1) various dates, Presenter
 Various Christmas shows and Pantomimes, 1975/2008, Acting/Singing

Documentaries
 When the Pipers Play, (4 awards) 1999, Singer/Producer/Producer
 Marie Curie, 2000, Presenter/Producer
 Scots Box, 2000, Presenter/Producer
 Highland Laddie, (Platinum Award) 2007, Singer/Presenter/Producer

Films
 Red Rose, 2005, Actress

References

External links

 Isla St Clair; The Mudcat Café

1952 births
Living people
20th-century Scottish women singers
Scottish folk musicians
People from Grangemouth
Butlins Redcoats
People from Banff and Buchan
21st-century Scottish women singers